Nuno Miguel Moreira da Cunha Ribeiro e Silva (born 15 July 1986) is a retired Portuguese football player of Angolan descent.

Club career
He made his professional debut in the Segunda Liga for Maia on 21 August 2005 in a game against Varzim.

He made his Primeira Liga debut for Olhanense on 23 September 2012 as a second-half substitute in a 0–1 loss against Vitória de Setúbal.

References

1986 births
Portuguese sportspeople of Angolan descent
Sportspeople from Matosinhos
Living people
Portuguese footballers
Ermesinde S.C. players
F.C. Maia players
Liga Portugal 2 players
S.C. Espinho players
S.C. Freamunde players
F.C. Tirsense players
C.F. União players
S.C. Olhanense players
Primeira Liga players
C.R.D. Libolo players
Portuguese expatriate footballers
Expatriate footballers in Angola
Girabola players
C.R. Caála players
C.D. Santa Clara players
Real Jaén footballers
Expatriate footballers in Spain
Portuguese expatriate sportspeople in Spain
S.C. Farense players
AD Fafe players
Association football forwards